Chincha (Quechua chincha, chinchay north, northern, ocelot) may refer to:

Locations 
Chincha Alta, a city in Peru
Chincha Islands, a group of islands off the coast of Peru
Chincha Province, one of five provinces of the Ica Region of Peru
Chincha Alta District, one of eleven districts of Chincha province
Chincha Baja District, one of eleven districts of Chincha province
Chinchay Suyu, a region of the Inca Empire
Chinchayqucha, a lake in central Peru

Other 
Chincha culture, a pre-Columbian ethnic group in Peru
Chincha Islands War, fought between Spain and Peru in 1864-1866
Chinchilla